Brush Hollow State Wildlife Area is located west of Penrose, Colorado and north of Fremont County Road 123 that connects Penrose to Cañon City, Colorado. It is centered on Brush Hollow Reservoir, which provides water to nearby Penrose.

The Brush Hollow State Wildlife Area occupies an area of approximately 400 acres. It ranges in elevation from 5,448 feet above sea level to 5,608 feet. Hunting is prohibited in the area, although permits for fishing are issued. The lake in the area has rainbow trout, largemouth bass, walleye, bluegill and channel catfish. The area is a popular place for birdwatching and wildlife viewing.

References

Protected areas of Colorado
Wildlife management areas of Colorado